Thomas Joseph Gola (January 13, 1933 – January 26, 2014) was an American basketball player and politician. He is widely considered one of the greatest NCAA basketball players of all-time. Gola was inducted into the Naismith Memorial Basketball Hall of Fame in 1976 and National Polish-American Sports Hall of Fame in 1977.

Early life
Gola was the third of seven children born to Ike and Helen Gola. Gola's father was a Philadelphia policeman of Polish descent who had changed the family's surname from "Galinsky". Gola was praised as a great all-around player as a high school student at La Salle College High School, where he led the Explorers to a Philadelphia Catholic League Championship. He entered La Salle a year after another Philadelphia basketball Hall of Famer, Paul Arizin, graduated from Villanova.

College career (1951–1955)
Gola was one of the most talented collegiate athletes in Philadelphia sports history. He came to national attention while playing for his hometown La Salle University Explorers men's basketball team.

Gola starred as a college freshman and led La Salle to the 1952 NIT championship.  Gola paced the Explorers to the NCAA basketball championship in 1954 and was named Tournament MVP. That same season he was selected as National Player of the Year. As a senior, Gola helped La Salle finish as the runner-up in the 1955 NCAA Tournament. At 6'6" (198 cm), Gola was clearly a forward who could shoot/score, rebound and defend, but he also had the ballhandling (dribbling, passing) skills of a guard, and with his shooting range and All-Pro defensive skills, could play just as well in the backcourt.

He averaged 20.9 points and 19.0 rebounds during 115 games and remains the NCAA All time rebounding leader with 2,201 career rebounds.

He was inducted into the La Salle Hall of Athletes in 1961 and the Big 5 Hall of Fame in 1986. In 1977, Tom Gola was inducted into the National Polish American Sports Hall of Fame. Gola was listed on "ESPN's Countdown to the Greatest" College basketball players as #17.

NBA career (1955–1966)
After a phenomenal college career, Gola turned pro with the Philadelphia Warriors as a territorial draft pick. He teamed with All-Pros Paul Arizin and Neil Johnston to lead the Warriors to an NBA championship in 1956. He gained praise for concentrating on defense, passing and rebounding and allowing the other two to be the chief scorers during these years.

In 1959, Johnston temporarily retired due to a knee injury and the Warriors added seven-foot superstar Wilt Chamberlain. Again sacrificing himself for his team, Gola helped the Warriors consistently reach the NBA Playoffs, but they could not beat the star-studded Boston Celtics in the NBA Eastern Division during his seasons in the early 1960s even with Chamberlain.  During the 1959–60 season, Gola became the first Warrior to have three straight games with a triple-double (the only other being Draymond Green, 2016). On January 10, 1960, Gola recorded 18 points, 19 rebounds and 11 assists in a 116–103 win over the New York Knicks.

Gola played with the New York Knicks from 1962 to 1966. He was enshrined in the Naismith Memorial Basketball Hall of Fame on April 26, 1976.

Coaching career (1968–1970)
In 1968, Gola returned to his alma mater as head coach, leading the Explorers to a 37–13 record during his two-year stay. He was named Coach of the Year by Philadelphia and New York journalists. He led the Explorers to a 23–1 record during the 1968–69 season, but La Salle had been barred from the NCAA Tournament before the season because an alumnus had offered some players "no-show" jobs. The school's Tom Gola Arena was named after him.

Political career
In 1968, Gola was elected to the Pennsylvania State House as a Republican, representing the Northeast Philadelphia-based 170th District. A change to the State Constitution made earlier that year had reorganized House seats into legislative districts, replacing the old system of allotting seats on an at-large, county-wide basis. This made Gola the first person to represent the newly created district. Ultimately, Gola would not finish-out his first term in the House, opting instead to seek the office of Philadelphia City Controller in 1969. He scored an 80,000 vote victory over Democrat Charles Peruto in the general election, and took office the following January.

Gola was defeated, however, in his bid for a second term in 1973 by Democrat William Klenk. His defeat was part of a broader setback for Republicans in the city that year, as Arlen Specter lost his bid for a third term as District Attorney. Gola made his final attempt at elected office in 1983, when he sought the office of Mayor. He came in last in the three-man Republican primary, behind Congressman Charlie Dougherty and the winner, John Egan, who went on to lose the fall general election to Wilson Goode.

Personal life
Gola was married to Caroline Norris in June 1955, and they had one son, Thomas Christopher.

Gola died on January 26, 2014, thirteen days after his 81st birthday, in Meadowbrook, Pennsylvania. A former US Army specialist, he was buried at the Washington Crossing National Cemetery in Upper Makefield Township, Bucks County, Pennsylvania.

College basketball achievements
 All-District player (four times, 1952–55)
 All-State player (four times, 1952–55)
 All-America selection (four times, 1952–55)
 Consensus All-American (three times, 1953–55)
 NIT Championship, NIT Co-MVP (1952)
 First alternate to US Olympic Basketball Team (1952)
 NCAA Championship, NCAA Tournament MVP (1954)
 College Basketball Player of the Year (1954)
 NCAA all-time rebounding leader (2,201)
 2,462 points
 102–19 (.843) won-lost record
 #15 retired by La Salle
 Inducted into the College Basketball Hall of Fame in 2016

Pro basketball achievements
 NBA championship (1956)
 All-NBA second team (1958)
 5-time NBA all-star (1960–1964)
 One of only two players to win NCAA, NIT & NBA championships
 Madison Square Garden Hall of Fame
 Inducted into the Naismith Basketball Hall of Fame (1976)

NBA career statistics

Regular season

Playoffs

College coaching record

 ‡ Ineligible for any postseason tournaments

See also
 List of NCAA Division I men's basketball players with 2,000 points and 1,000 rebounds
 List of NCAA Division I men's basketball career rebounding leaders

References

External links

 
 Basketball Hall of Fame profile
 National Polish-American Sports HOF profile

1933 births
2014 deaths
All-American college men's basketball players
American athlete-politicians
American men's basketball coaches
American men's basketball players
American politicians of Polish descent
Basketball coaches from Pennsylvania
Basketball players from Philadelphia
La Salle Explorers men's basketball coaches
La Salle Explorers men's basketball players
Republican Party members of the Pennsylvania House of Representatives
Naismith Memorial Basketball Hall of Fame inductees
National Basketball Association All-Stars
New York Knicks players
Philadelphia Warriors draft picks
Philadelphia Warriors players
San Francisco Warriors players
Shooting guards
Small forwards
Politicians from Philadelphia